Given a graph , another graph  is -saturated if  does not contain a (not necessarily induced) copy of , but adding any edge to  it does. The function  is the minimum number of edges an -saturated graph  on  vertices can have. For some results, see https://faculty.math.illinois.edu/~west/regs/saturate.html.

In matching theory, there is a different definition.
We also say that  saturates .

See also
 Hall's marriage theorem
 Bipartite matching

References

Matching (graph theory)